Storm Over Bengal is a 1938 adventure film that was nominated at the 11th Academy Awards for Best Score, the nomination was for Cy Feuer. Set during the British Raj, the film's working title was Bengal Lancer Patrol. The film was shot in Owens Valley, California.  The film stars Patric Knowles in his first film after leaving Warner Bros. as well as Richard Cromwell and Douglass Dumbrille who played similar roles in Lives of a Bengal Lancer.

In the film, the throne of the princely state of Lhanapur is usurped by an Indian revolutionary. He tries to gain support for his planned revolt through radio broadcasts, while officers of the Royal Air Force try to undermine his plans.

Plot
Two Royal Air Force officers, Flt Lt Hallett and F/O Neil Allison visit a British outpost in India. Neil is the younger brother of Army Intelligence Officer Captain Jeffrey Allison who is away on an undercover mission in the unaligned and independent princely state of Lhanapur. The British are worried about radio broadcasts from Ramin Khan inciting the Indian people to revolt.  Upon the death of the elderly Maharajah of Lhanapur, Ramin Khan schemes to usurp the throne as a base for his revolt.

Disguised as an Indian holy man, Jeffrey gathers intelligence on Ramin Khan's insurgents whilst the British send a diplomatic mission to Lhanapur who are ambushed and killed.  The young Neil is himself in love with Jeffrey's fiancée Joan Lattimore and is jealous of his brother.  Upon his return from Lhanapur, Jeffrey postpones his wedding so Joan can flee to safety.  With the death of the diplomatic party, Jeffrey is flown to Lhanapur by Hallett in his aircraft to meet with the Maharajah. Ramin Khan captures Jeffrey and mortally wounds Hallett who flies back to inform the British of Ramin Khan's activity.  Ramin Khan is delighted as he plans to ambush the British field force in a ravine near the caves of Kali.

Cast

Patric Knowles as Capt. Jeffrey Allison
Richard Cromwell as Flying Officer Neil Allison 
Rochelle Hudson as Joan Lattimore
Douglass Dumbrille as Ramin Khan 
Colin Tapley as Flight Lieutenant Hallett  
Gilbert Emery as Colonel Torrance 
Douglas Walton as Terry
Halliwell Hobbes as Sir John Galt 
John Burton as Captain Carter
Clyde Cook as Alf
Claud Allister as Redding 
Pedro de Cordoba as Abdul Mir 
Edward Van Sloan as Maharajah of Lhanapur

References

External links 
 

 

1930s war adventure films
1938 films
British Empire war films
Films set in the British Raj
Films shot in California
American black-and-white films
1930s English-language films
Films directed by Sidney Salkow
Republic Pictures films
American war adventure films
Films with screenplays by Garrett Fort
Films about revolutions
Films about the Royal Air Force
Films about radio
1930s American films